Germany–Jamaica relations are the current and historical relations  between Germany and Jamaica.

There are 160 people of German descent living in Jamaica.

People
 Dustin Brown - German professional tennis player.

See also
 Germans in Jamaica

References

External links
"Jamaica", from the German Federal Foreign Office

 
Jamaica
Bilateral relations of Jamaica